Zarema Kasaeva (born February 25, 1987) is a Russian weightlifter. Kasaeva became an Olympic medalist during the 2004 Summer Olympics when she won the bronze medal in the women's -69 kg class.

At the 2005 World Weightlifting Championships she won the gold medal in the 69 kg category, with a world record clean and jerk of 157 kg, and a total of 275 kg.

Kasaeva participated in the women's -75 kg class at the 2006 World Weightlifting Championships and won the bronze medal, finishing behind Cao Lei and Nadezhda Evstyukhina. She snatched 110 kg and clean and jerked an additional 136 kg for a total of 246 kg, 22 kg behind winner Cao.

Career statistics

References

Living people
1987 births
Russian female weightlifters
Olympic weightlifters of Russia
Weightlifters at the 2004 Summer Olympics
Olympic bronze medalists for Russia
World record setters in weightlifting
Place of birth missing (living people)
Olympic medalists in weightlifting
Medalists at the 2004 Summer Olympics
European Weightlifting Championships medalists
World Weightlifting Championships medalists
21st-century Russian women